Mark Gower (born 5 October 1978) is a former English footballer, who played for several clubs including Barnet, Southend United and Swansea City.

Career
Born in Edmonton, London and moving to Romford, Gower began his career at Gidea Park Rangers, alongside Danny Cowley, before joining Tottenham Hotspur, where he was a member of the League Cup winning squad in the 1998–99 season. He had a spell on loan at Motherwell before joining Barnet in January 2001 for £32,500. At Motherwell he scored his first career goal in a 2–1 loss at Rangers. He joined Swansea City after declining a new contract at Southend United. He has the ability to play across the midfield, and he signed for Swansea City on a free transfer.

A midfielder, he is predominantly right-footed but can play on either flank or in the middle. Gower played for England schoolboys through to the under 18 team from the age of 14.

Gower played for Southend for five seasons, scoring 39 goals in the process. He moved to Swansea City when his contract at Southend expired. Gower failed to score in his first season with Swansea.

Before the start of the 2009–10 season, Gower revealed he would be ditching his number 11 shirt, when he chose that number all the squad told him it was 'cursed' and fail to find good form. Gower from then on wore the number 27 shirt. Shortly after changing shirt numbers he scored four goals in two pre-season friendlies. He finally scored his first league goal for Swansea in the 2–0 win over Queens Park Rangers. Since the start of the 2010–11 season under new manager Brendan Rodgers, Gower has adapted a new role in the centre of midfield and had played with eight different players this season in that very same position: Jordi López, Andrea Orlandi, Kemy Agustien, Darren Pratley, Joe Allen, David Cotterill, Scott Donnelly and the returning Leon Britton. Gower signed a one-year extension to his contract in November 2010, the extension proved Gower was viewed as integral to Brendan Rodgers plans.

Gower scored two 25-yard goals in consecutive games against Norwich City and Hull City respectively.

Gower signed for Charlton Athletic on a free from Swansea City on 3 June 2013, after a successful loan spell towards the end of the 2012–13 Football League season. On 22 May 2014, he was released from Charlton Athletic.

Career statistics

Honours
Southend United
Football League Two Play-off Champions: 2004–05
Football League One Champions: 2005–06
Football League Trophy Runners Up: 2004, 2005

Swansea City
Football League Championship Play-off Champions: 2010–11

References

External links

1978 births
Living people
Footballers from Edmonton, London
English footballers
Association football midfielders
Tottenham Hotspur F.C. players
Motherwell F.C. players
Barnet F.C. players
Southend United F.C. players
Swansea City A.F.C. players
Charlton Athletic F.C. players
Scottish Premier League players
English Football League players
National League (English football) players
Premier League players
Ebbsfleet United F.C. players